Jitendra Tiwari is an Indian politician. He is a member of the Bharatiya Janata Party. He is the former mayor of Asansol and Member of the Legislative Assembly (India) from West Bengal Legislative Assembly representing the Pandaveswar constituency.

Controversies 
Tiwari has been in numerous controversies due to his acts and activism in political activities.
 In March 2019, the Election Commission of India sent show-cause notice to Jitendra Tiwari for announcing a monetary reward to councillors who would ensure the victory of a Trinamool Congress candidate in the 2019 Indian general election.
 In May 2019, footage of Tiwari was released by Times Now where he was caught threatening a police official in Durgapur, West Bengal.
 In June 2019, Tiwari accused MP Babul Supriyo of threatening him during a call.
 On 13 December 2020, Tiwari wrote a letter to the Minister of Urban Development and Municipal Affairs Firhad Hakim, accusing the Mamata Banerjee-led government of doing injustice to the city of Asansol by depriving the city from central government schemes.
 On 17 December 2020, Tiwari left the Trinamool Congress and resigned from the post of chairman and administrator of Asansol Municipal Corporation.

Political career 
Tiwari started his political career with the Trinamool Congress in 2011. In December 2020, he left the Trinamool Congress but joined again after a few days. On 2 March 2021, he resigned from Trinamool Congress and joined the Bharatiya Janata Party in the presence of Dilip Ghosh.

References 

Living people
People from Asansol
Mayors of places in West Bengal
1979 births
Bharatiya Janata Party politicians from West Bengal
Trinamool Congress politicians from West Bengal